Gabriel Brezoianu (born 18 January 1977 in Bucharest) is a Romanian retired rugby union player.

He began his club career with Timișoara (1995/99), then played for Steaua Bucharest (1999/00). He then moved to France, playing for Bègles-Bordeaux (2000/03), US Dax (2003/06), Racing Métro 92 Paris (2006/07) and Tarbes Pyrénées Rugby (2007/08).

Brezoianu played his first game for Romania on 20 April 1996, in an 83–5 win against Belgium.

He played at three Rugby World Cup finals, in 1999, 2003 and 2007.

He has 71 caps for Romania, from 1996 to 2007, with 28 tries scored and 1 conversion, 142 points in aggregate.

Honours
Romania
European Nations Cup (2): 2000, 2002

External links
 
 
 

1977 births
Living people
Rugby union players from Bucharest
Romanian rugby union players
Rugby union centres
SCM Rugby Timișoara players
CSA Steaua București (rugby union) players
CS Politehnica Iași (rugby union) players
US Dax players
Racing 92 players
Tarbes Pyrénées Rugby players
Romania international rugby union players
Romanian expatriate rugby union players
Expatriate rugby union players in France
Romanian expatriate sportspeople in France
CA Bordeaux-Bègles Gironde players